Hymenobacter mucosus  is a Gram-negative, rod-shaped and non-motile bacterium from the genus of Hymenobacter which has been isolated from soil from the Jiuxiang cave in China. It produces red, watermelonlike pigment from the plectaniaxanthin series of carotenoid pigments. The 16S RNA analysis has revealed its similarity to Hymenobacter tibetensis, Hymenobacter gelipurpurascens and Hymenobacter xinjiangensis

References 

mucosus
Bacteria described in 2015